James Brite (September 13, 1864 – February 6, 1942) was an American architect.

Early life
James Brite was born in Pasquotank County, North Carolina, the son of George W. Brite and Mary Richardson. In 1870, his father was a farmer, living at New Land Township, Pasquotank County, and James was the second of five children, and the eldest son.

Career
Brite worked for McKim, Mead & White (MMW) in New York City, one of the best-known architectural firms of its time. In 1897, together with Henry Bacon, they left to form Brite and Bacon Architects.

Brite designed The Braes at Glen Cove, New York, for the businessman Herbert L. Pratt.

Brite was the architect of Darlington, a 45,000 square feet house at Mahwah, New Jersey, built in 1907 for George Crocker, and now owned by Ilija Pavlovic.

He retired in 1927.

Personal life
On 18 April 1891, Brite married Aimée Kindersley Douglas (1868–1951), the daughter of Nathaniel B. Kindersley and Hamilton Douglas, in Manhattan.

Brite died on February 6, 1942, at Howey-in-the-Hills, Florida. His wife survived him.

References

1942 deaths
1864 births
19th-century American architects
People from Pasquotank County, North Carolina
20th-century American architects